Herrania mariae is a species of flowering plant in the family Malvaceae. It is native to South America - Colombia, Ecuador, Peru and Brazil. The fruits are locally used as food.

References

mariae